= Alexandros Potamianos =

Alexandros Potamianos is an engineer at the National Technical University of Athens, Greece. He was named a Fellow of the Institute of Electrical and Electronics Engineers (IEEE) in 2016 for his contributions to human-centered speech and multimodal signal analysis.
